Danny Breen (born ) is a Canadian politician, who is the mayor of St. John's, Newfoundland and Labrador. He was elected in the 2017 municipal election on September 26, 2017. He was acclaimed in the 2021 municipal election.

Prior to his election to the mayoralty, Breen represented Ward 1 on St. John's City Council from 2009 until 2017. He ran as a Progressive Conservative candidate for the Newfoundland and Labrador House of Assembly in a 2014 by-election in the electoral district of Virginia Waters, but was defeated by Liberal Cathy Bennett.

Breen is a graduate of Memorial University of Newfoundland with a Bachelor of Arts degree in political science.

Electoral history 

}
|-

|-

|align="right"|1892
|align="right"|39.05
|align="right"|-20.99
|-
 
|NDP
|Sheilagh O'Leary
|align="right"|1021
|align="right"|21.07
|align="right"|-9.35

|}

References

1960s births
Mayors of St. John's, Newfoundland and Labrador
Candidates in Newfoundland and Labrador provincial elections
Living people
Progressive Conservative Party of Newfoundland and Labrador politicians